Nicoleta Raluca Onel (born 8 March 1982) is a former Romanian artistic gymnast. She drew notice at national and international competitions in the mid-1990s, but was forced to retire early after a spinal injury.

Onel's gymnastics achievements included second-place finishes in the all-around at the 1995 European Junior Championships and the 1997 World Junior Championships.

Biography

Onel was born in Ploieşti, Romania, and started gymnastics at the age of 6. Her first major international success came in 1995, when she placed second in the all-around at the European Junior Championships in Belgium. The following year, she was selected to train with the senior national team in Deva. At the 1997 World Junior Championships, Onel won silver medals with the Romanian team and in the individual all-around. In 1998, Onel suffered a spinal injury and was advised to quit competitive gymnastics. She was hired as a gymnastics instructor at a local club in the Romanian capital, Bucharest. In 2001, she was offered a coaching position in the United Arab Emirates, at the International School of Choueifat in Al Ain.

Competitions and results

National competitions

1991
Team: 1st place
Uneven bars: 2nd place

1992
Uneven bars: 1st place
All-round: 2nd place

1993
Uneven bars: 1st place
All-round: 2nd place
Team: 2nd place

1994
Uneven bars: 1st place
All-round: 1st place
Floor: 2nd place
Horse vault: 3rd place

1995
Beam: 1st place
Uneven bars: 2nd place
Floor: 2nd place
Horse vault: 2nd place

Regional competitions

1995 (Hungary)
Team: 1st place
Uneven bars: 2nd place

1996 (Bulgaria)
Team: 1st place

International competitions

1995 (England)
Team: 1st place
All-round: 4th place

1995 (Romania)
Team: 1st place
All-round: 3rd place

1995 (Guatemala)
Team: 1st place
Beam: 1st place
All-round: 2nd place
Uneven bars: 2nd place
Floor: 2nd place

1995 (Netherlands)
All-round: 5th place

1996 (Germany)
Team: 1st place

1997 (U.S.A)
Team: 3rd place

1997 (Spain)
Team: 1st place

1998 (U.S.A)
Team: 2nd place

European junior championships

1995 (Belgium)
Team: 2nd place
Uneven bars: 2nd place

1996 (England)
Team: 3rd place

World junior championships

1997 (Japan)
Beam: 2nd place
Uneven bars: 2nd place
Floor: 2nd place
All-round: 2nd place

European youth Olympics

1997 (Portugal)
All-round: 2nd place

External links
 Nicoleta Onel official website
 Nicoleta Onel on YouTube
 Bios at romanian-gymnastics.com
 The U.S Gymnastics website section dedicated to Nicoleta Onel
 The World Junior Gymnastics Championships (Japan, 1997) website section dedicated to Nicoleta Onel
 An animations website section dedicated to Nicoleta Onel
 Romanian gymnastics forgotten stars: a website section dedicated to Nicoleta Onel
 A webpage dedicated to Nicoleta Onel

1982 births
Living people
Sportspeople from Ploiești
Romanian female artistic gymnasts